Folkestad is a surname. Notable people with the surname include:

Anders Folkestad (born 1949), Norwegian schoolteacher and trade unionist
Aud Folkestad (born 1953), Norwegian politician
Bernhard Folkestad (1879–1933), Norwegian painter and essayist
Göran Folkestad (born 1952), Swedish songwriter and singer
Halvor Olsen Folkestad (1807–1889), Norwegian Lutheran bishop
Olav Georg Folkestad (1902–1976), Norwegian engineer